Dani Shapiro is an American writer, the author of six novels including Family History (2003), Black & White (2007) and most recently Signal Fires (2022) and the best-selling memoirs Slow Motion (1998), Devotion (2010), Hourglass (2017), and Inheritance (2019). She has also written for magazines such as The New Yorker, The Oprah Magazine, Vogue, and Elle. In February 2019, she created an original podcast on iHeart Radio called Family Secrets.

Early life and education
Shapiro was born Daneile Shapiro on April 10, 1962, In New York City. She is the daughter of Paul Shapiro, from an Orthodox Jewish family (who, she later learned through a recreational DNA test, was not her biological father), and Irene Shapiro, from South Jersey. Shapiro attended a Solomon Schechter Jewish day school through 6th grade, after which she attended the Pingry School in New Jersey. She attended Sarah Lawrence College, where she was taught by Grace Paley.

Career

Writing 
Shapiro's novels include Playing with Fire, Fugitive Blue, Picturing the Wreck, Family History, Black & White, and Signal Fires.  Her best-selling memoirs include Slow Motion, Devotion, Still Writing: The Perils and Pleasures of a Creative Life, Hourglass: Time, Memory, Marriage, and most recently, Inheritance: A Memoir of Genealogy, Paternity, and Love. 

Signal Fires was named a best book of 2022 by Time Magazine, Washington Post, and others, and is a national bestseller.

Angela Haupt writes: "On a cold night in 2010, a retired doctor sits underneath an ancient oak tree with the unusual little boy who lives across the street. The boy points out the constellations, and what they represent. The man—unlike anyone else in the boy’s life—listens. Though the boy doesn’t know it, this isn’t the first time their lives have intersected, and they’ll soon become linked again in a way that will endure time and distance. Signal Fires, Dani Shapiro’s first novel in 15 years, follows the man and his family, and the boy and his parents, across decades, lyrically examining the ways a single event can alter many lives forever." 

In Inheritance, Shapiro writes about her experience of learning through a recreational DNA test that her biological father was not Paul Shapiro; rather, she had been conceived by the primitive practice of mixing Paul's sperm with that of an anonymous donor, whom she later was able to identify. Inheritance debuted at #11 on the New York Times Best Seller list and Ruth Franklin called it "beautifully written and deeply moving." The San Francisco Chronicle described Inheritance as "as compulsively readable as a mystery novel, while exploring the deeper mysteries of identity and family and truth itself… a story told with great insight and honesty and heart." And Pulitzer Prize winning author Jennifer Egan wrote that “Inheritance is Dani Shapiro at her best: a gripping genetic detective story, and a meditation on the meaning of parenthood and family.” The memoir was included on several best-of-the-year lists, including that of Vanity Fair, Oprah Magazine, Lit Hub and Wired. Inheritance is being adapted for film by Shapiro's husband, journalist and screenwriter Michael Maren, in development with Killer Films.

In addition to The New Yorker, The Oprah Magazine, Vogue, and Elle, Shapiro's writing has also appeared in Salon, and n+1, among others.

Screenwriting 
Shapiro has also written for the screen; in 1999, she adapted Oscar Wilde's The Happy Prince for HBO and in 2000, she co-wrote a screenplay based on her memoir, Slow Motion, with Michael Maren. Shapiro is currently adapting Sue Miller's bestselling novel Monogamy for film for Killer Films and Yellow Bear Films. She is also adapting Signal Fires for its television adaptation.

Teaching 
Dani has taught writing classes and workshops at NYU, Wesleyan University and Columbia University as well Kripalu Center for Yoga and Health, 1440 Multiversity, and Fine Arts Work Center. On March 31, 2020, she launched her first digital course, "Writing for Inner Calm: Methods & Exercises", on the Skillshare online learning platform.

She also co-founded Sirenland Writers Conference which takes place annually in Positano, Italy.

Podcasting 
In collaboration with iHeart Radio, Shapiro launched the original podcast Family Secrets in 2019. Each episode of this iTunes Top 10 podcast features a conversation between Dani and a guest who's experienced a family secret and its effects. The podcast's seventh season premiered on September 1, 2022 the podcast has over 30 million downloads.

In addition to Family Secrets, Dani created and hosted another podcast with iHeart Radio, The Way We Live Now, which launched in April 2020 and concluded in July 2020. The podcast examined the way people from all walks of life have coped during the COVID-19 pandemic.

Personal life 
Shapiro has been married since 1997 to screenwriter Michael Maren, and they have a son, Jacob. In the early 2000s, Dani and her family moved from Brooklyn, NY to Litchfield County, Connecticut.

Books

Playing with Fire Doubleday Publishing Group, 1990,  
Fugitive Blue Nan A. Talese, 1992,  
Picturing the Wreck Doubleday, 1995,  
Slow Motion: A True Story Random House, 1998 
Family History: A Novel Knopf, 2004 
Black & White Knopf, 2007 
Devotion: A Memoir Harper, 2010 
Still Writing: The Perils and Pleasures of a Creative Life Atlantic Monthly Press, 2013 
Hourglass: Time, Memory, Marriage Knopf, 2017 
Inheritance: A Memoir of Genealogy, Paternity, and Love Knopf, 2019

Appearances (selected)

 Oprah Winfrey's Super Soul Sunday, on the Oprah Winfrey Network, to discuss Devotion on October 20, 2013 
 Today Show on NBC to discuss Inheritance on January 15, 2019 
 CBS This Morning to discuss Inheritance on April 6, 2019
 PBS News Hour to discuss Inheritance on March 31, 2020

Awards 
 2023: National Jewish Book Award winner in the JJ Greenberg Memorial Award for Fiction category for Signal Fires
 2019: National Jewish Book Award winner in the Autobiography and Memoir category for Inheritance: A Memoir of Genealogy, Paternity, and Love 
2019: Inheritance named a finalist for the Goodreads Choice Award in the Memoir category 
2020: Inheritance named a finalist for the Wingate Prize for a non-fiction book "to translate the idea of Jewishness to the general reader."

References

External links

Official Website
Internet Movie Database Bio
Litchfield County Writers Project
Sirenland Writers Conference
Super Soul Sunday

1962 births
Living people
20th-century American novelists
21st-century American novelists
Screenwriters from New York (state)
American women novelists
Jewish American writers
Pingry School alumni
Wesleyan University faculty
American women screenwriters
Writers from New York City
20th-century American women writers
21st-century American women writers
Novelists from New York (state)
Novelists from Connecticut
Screenwriters from Connecticut
American women academics
21st-century American Jews
American women memoirists